Bandar-e Olya (also Romanized as Bāndar-e ‘Olyā and Bondar-e ‘Olyā; also known as  Bondar-e Bālā) is a village in Kuhestan Rural District, Kelardasht District, Chalus County, Mazandaran Province, Iran. At the 2006 census, its population was 70, in 21 families.

References 

Populated places in Chalus County